Ganjab (also Romanized as Ganjāb and Ganj Āb) is a village in Kuh Sardeh Rural District, in the Central District of Malayer County, Hamadan Province, Iran. At the 2006 census, its population was 158, in 41 families.

References 

Populated places in Malayer County